Nemperor Records was an American jazz and pop music record label active from 1974 to 1986. It was distributed by Atlantic Records from 1974 to 1977 and then CBS Records from 1978 until the label was absorbed by subsidiary Epic Records. The label's catalog is owned by Sony Music Entertainment.

It was founded in 1966 by The Beatles' manager Brian Epstein, Nat Weiss,  and Shaun Weiss as the management company Nemperor Artists. In 1974, the company became a record label after releasing the album Like Children by Jerry Goodman and Jan Hammer. Others who recorded for Nemperor include The Romantics,Phoebe Legere and Stanley Clarke.

Sample discography

References

American record labels
Jazz record labels
Sony Music